Red Seal may refer to:
 Red Seal (tobacco) sold by the U.S. Smokeless Tobacco Company
 Red Seal Program, a Canadian program to assess the skills of tradespeople
 Red seal ships, 17th century Japanese armed merchant sailing ships
 RCA Red Seal Records, owned by Sony Music
 Red Seal (film), a 1950 Italian film directed by  Flavio Calzavara